Roy Brown may refer to:

Arts, music and entertainment
Roy Brown (blues musician) (1920/25–1981), American blues musician who was a pioneer of rock and roll
Roy Brown (Puerto Rican musician) (born 1945), Puerto Rican musician and folk singer
Roy Brown (clown) (1932–2001), American clown, puppeteer and artist
Roy Chubby Brown (born 1945), British comedian

Business and industry
Roy Brown Jr. (1916–2013), American designer of the Ford Edsel
Roy Brown (businessman) (born 1946), British businessman and engineer, former chairman of GKN

Politics
Roy Brown (Manitoba politician) (1896–1961), politician in Manitoba, Canada
Roy Brown (Montana politician) (born 1951), Montana state Senator and gubernatorial candidate

Sports
Roy Brown (footballer, born 1917) (1917–2005), English footballer for Nottingham Forest, Wrexham and Mansfield Town
Roy Brown (footballer, born 1923) (1923–1989), English footballer with Stoke City and Watford, the first black player to play for Stoke
Roy Brown (footballer, born 1925) (1925–2004), English football full back with Darlington
Roy Brown (footballer, born 1945), English football goalkeeper with Tottenham Hotspur, Reading, Notts County and Mansfield Town
Roy Brown (ice hockey) (1880–1950), Canadian ice hockey player

Others
Roy Brown (RAF officer) (1893–1944), Canadian pilot who was credited with shooting down the Red Baron
Roy W. Brown (born 1947), former president of the International Humanist and Ethical Union (IHEU)